Byron Wells (born 3 April 1992) is a New Zealand freestyle skier. He competed at the FIS Freestyle World Ski Championships 2011 in Utah, in halfpipe and slopestyle. He qualified for the 2014 Winter Olympics in Sochi, in men's halfpipe, but did not start. His brother is also an international freestyle skier, Beau-James Wells.

References

External links
 
 
 
 
 

1992 births
Living people
Freestyle skiers at the 2014 Winter Olympics
New Zealand male freestyle skiers
Olympic freestyle skiers of New Zealand
People from Wānaka
Freestyle skiers at the 2018 Winter Olympics